Roclincourt is a commune in the Pas-de-Calais department in northern France.

Geography

List of successive mayors

History

World War I

Roclincourt found itself uncomfortably close to most of the fighting during World War I, with tragic consequences for the village. During the opening years of the war, the nearby trenches were manned by French troops of the 10th Army. In February 1916, the 10th army was sent to reinforce Verdun, which had been under heavy attack by the Germans. In its place in the Roclincourt sector, British troops of 5th Division, 95th Brigade were sent in, namely the 1st Battalion of the Devonshire Regiment, who rotated every three days with the 1st Battalion of the East Surrey Regiment. The British troops were surprised and not pleased to find the trenches along this sector to be in a very poor condition. The parapets were in a very poor state and there were insufficient firing platforms. It took these two battalions some time to get the trenches back up to a good standard. On the plus side, the area had become relatively quiet, although there was a campaign of mining and counter-mining. To this day, craters can still be found along the line of the front in this area. The line suffered from occasional bombardments from the German lines. Both the Devonshires and the East Surreys suffered casualties due to these bombardments and members of both regiments can be found in the cemeteries around Roclincourt and Arras.

During World War I the village was very close to the front and by the end of the conflict it had been completely destroyed. The village was then rebuilt.

Transportation
 Rail: LGV Nord from Arras
 Bus: Local service
 Air: provincial Airport of Roclincourt

Close to the village is a provincial airport which is called Roclincourt and has the Airport ICAO code LFQD, were there is one runway that is 1,025m in length and 60m wide. The village has excellent road links, being close to a junction on the A26 autoroute which gives it good access to the whole of the European motorway network.

Twin towns
Roclincourt has been twinned with Montesquiou, Gers, France, since 1999.

See also
Communes of the Pas-de-Calais department

References

External links

 Roclicourt Battlefields
Finding Private Adams The story of one of the soldiers who lies in Roclincourt Military Cemetery

Communes of Pas-de-Calais